Lakkidi-Perur-II  is a village in Palakkad district in the state of Kerala, India.

Demographics
 India census, Lakkidi-Perur-II had a population of 19,686 with 9,393 males and 10,293 females.

References

Villages in Palakkad district